The Harbin Y-12 is a high wing twin-engine turboprop utility aircraft built by Harbin Aircraft Industry Group (HAIG).

Design and development
The Y-12 started as a development of the Harbin Y-11 airframe
called Y-11T in 1980. The design featured numerous improvements including a redesigned wing with a new low drag section, a larger fuselage and bonded rather than riveted construction. It also replaced the radial piston engines with turboprops.

The prototype was followed by about 30 production Y-12 (I) aircraft before a revised version was produced. This was designated the Y-12 (II), which featured more powerful engines and removal of leading edge slats, first flying on 16 August 1984 and receiving Chinese certification in December of the following year. The power plants are two Pratt & Whitney Canada PT6A-27 turboprops with Hartzell propellers. The Y-12 has a maximum takeoff weight of 5,700 kg (12,600 lb) with seating for 17 passengers and two crew. The aircraft is operated as a light commuter and transport aircraft.

The latest development is the Y-12F, which is almost a new design with many improvements: new wings, landing gear, fuselage, more powerful engines, and extended payload and range. The Y-12F made its maiden flight on December 29, 2010, received CAAC type certification on December 10, 2015, and FAA type certification on February 22, 2016. In 2015, Kenmore Air announced that they would begin development of floats for the Y-12 for FAA certification. The Y-12 completed the FAA evaluation flight tests for its automatic flight control system on June 30, 2018, with its performance meeting the requirements, said AVIC Harbin Aircraft Industry Company Ltd (AVIC HAFEI).

Variants

 Y-12 (I): Twin-engined STOL utility transport aircraft, powered by two 500-shp (373-kW) Pratt & Whitney Canada PT6A-11 turboprop engines. Prototype version.
 Y-12 (II): Fitted with more powerful PT6A-27 engines.
 Y-12 (III): Planned version to be fitted with WJ-9 turboprop. Evolved to Y-12C because of IV's success when WJ-9 development was completed.
 Y-12 (IV): Improved version. Revised wingtips (span increased to 19.2 m (63 ft)) and increased takeoff weight. 19 passenger seats. This version is the first aircraft in the series certified by the FAA in 1995.
 Y-12C: Basically a (IV) version with WJ-9 turboprop, used by PLAAF for aerial survey.
 Y-12D: Domestically deployed military version with upgraded engines driving four-bladed propellers, used by PLA Airborne Corps for parachute training.
 Y-12E: Variant with 18 passenger seats. PT6A-135A engines of equal horsepower but increased torque driving four-bladed propellers. This version was certified by the FAA in 2006.
 Y-12F: The latest development with almost everything redesigned: wider fuselage, new wings, retractable landing gear and more powerful PT6A-65B engines. The Y-12F has higher cruise speed, longer range and can accommodate 19 passengers or 3x LD3 containers. Design started in April 2005 and the maiden flight was on 29 December 2010. CAAC type certification was received on 10 December 2015 and FAA certification on 22 February 2016. The Y-12F passed flight tests for its automatic flight control system by the FAA on 30 June 2018. It was demonstrated during the 2012 Zhuhai Airshow.
 Y-12G: Proposed cargo version of Y-12F.
 Turbo Panda: Export name for (II) version, marketed by England and Japanese companies. No real order due to airworthiness certification.
 Twin Panda: Originally (II) version for export. Later a modified Y-12 (IV) powered by two Pratt & Whitney Canada PT6A-34 turboprop engines and fitted with uprated undercarriage, upgraded avionics and interior. Thirty-five orders reportedly received by 2000 but production not proceeded with.

Operators

Military operators

 Afghan Air Force

 Royal Cambodian Air Force

 People's Liberation Army Air Force

 Djibouti Air Force - 2 as of December 2016.

 Eritrean Air Force

 Ghana Air Force

 Guyana Air Force

 Islamic Revolutionary Guard Corps Air Force

 Kenya Air Force To be replaced by the C-145 Skytruck.
 
Mali Air Force – 2

 Mauritanian Air Force

 Myanmar Air Force - 2 as of December 2016.

 Namibian Air Force

 Pakistan Air Force
 Pakistan Army

 Policía Nacional del Perú
 Peruvian Air Force

 Sri Lanka Air Force

 Tanzanian Air Force

 Zambian Air Force

Government operators

 Air Vigilance Service  (2)

 China Marine Surveillance  (3)

 Ministry of Transport  (2)

 Federated States of Micronesia (1)

 Republic of Seychelles (2)

Civil operators

 China Flying Dragon Aviation
 China Heilongjiang Longken General Aviation
 Donghua General Aviation
 Jiangnan General Aviation
 Ordos General Aviation Co. Ltd.
 Shuangyang General Aviation
 Xinjiang General Aviation
 Ying'an Airlines
 Zhong Fei General Aviation Company

 SATENA (2, 1 on order)

 Trans Air Congo (10 on order)

 LAC
 Congo Airways - 2 on order as of July 2016.

Caroline Islands Air

Air Fiji

 Sabang Merauke Raya Air Charter (SMAC)
 Dirgantara Air Service (DAS)

 Pouya Air

 Air Kiribati

 Berjaya Air

 MIAT Mongolian Airlines- After 2 planes crashed, the remaining 3 planes were returned to the manufacturer.

 Blue Airways (3 on order)
 Flight Care Aviation
 Nepal Airlines - 4 Delivered in 2012. All 4 grounded in 2020 due to sub-standard performance and high operating costs.
 Nepal Airways

 Air Eagle

 Helitours

 Real Tonga - 1 in service with 1 on order July 2016.
 Airlines Tonga

 Uganda Air Cargo (2)

Accidents and incidents
 On 13 December 1993, a Lao Aviation (now Lao Airlines) Y-12-II, registration RDPL-34117, clipped trees in fog and crashed at Phonsavan, Laos, killing all 18 on board.
 On 4 April 1995, a TANS Y-12-II, registration 333/OB-1498, crashed shortly after takeoff from Iquitos Airport, Peru, killing all three on board.
 On 21 June 1996, a China Flying Dragon Aviation Y-12-II, registration B-3822, crashed into a  mountain near Changhai Airport after the crew began the final approach too early and deviated from the intended course, killing two of 12 on board.
 On 20 January 1997, a Sri Lanka Air Force Y-12-II, CR851, crashed off Palali Air Base while on a surveillance mission, killing all four on board.
 On 10 June 1997, a MIAT Mongolian Airlines Y-12-II, registration JU-1020, crashed at Mandalgobi Airport due to windshear, killing seven of 12 on board.
 On 26 May 1998, a MIAT Mongolian Airlines Y-12-II, registration JU-1017, crashed into a  mountain near Galt, Mongolia, en route to Tosontsengel due to heavy icing, wing de-ice system fault and overloading, killing all 28 on board; this crash is the worst ever accident involving the Y-12.
 On 19 October 2000, Lao Aviation Flight 703 crashed in a mountainous area in bad weather while on approach to Sam Neua, killing eight of 15 passengers; both pilots survived.
 On 18 May 2005, a Zambia Air Force Y-12-II, AF-216, crashed shortly after takeoff from Mongu Airport, killing all 13 on board.
 On 10 April 2006, a Kenya Air Force (KAF) Y-12-II, 132, struck the side of Mount Marsabit, killing 14 of 17 on board.
 On 15 June 2008, a China Flying Dragon Aviation Y-12-II, registration B-3841, struck a small hill during a survey flight for a new aluminum mine, killing three of four on board.
 On 12 July 2012, a Y-12-II of the Mauritanian Air Force crashed while transporting gold, killing all 7 occupants.
 On 12 May 2014, a Y-12-II of the Kenyan Air Force crashed in El Wak, Kenya. The airplane operated on a flight from Mandera to Nairobi with stops at El Wak and Garissa. Preliminary information suggests that one pilot was killed and the remaining eleven occupants were injured.
 On 26 August 2018, a Y-12e of the Colombian Air Force was damaged in flight as it encountered severe turbulence. The pilot made an emergency landing at Florencia. The aircraft was not repaired, and was scrapped in situ. 
 On 3 January 2020, a Y-12-II of the Sri Lankan Air Force crashed to Haputale, Sri Lanka, while on aerial observations, killing all 4 airmen.
 On 4 August 2020, a Y-12-II of the Kenyan Air Force resupplying AMISOM crashed after taking off from Dhobley Airstrip in Somalia. All 10 occupants survived. The aircraft was seriously damaged.

Specifications (Y-12 (II))

See also

References

Notes

Bibliography

 Hoyle, Craig. "World Air Forces Directory". Flight International. Vol. 182, No. 5321, 11–17 December 2012, pp. 40–64. .
 Hoyle, Craig. "World Air Forces Directory". Flight International. Vol. 190, No. 5566, 6–12 December 2016, pp. 22–53. .
 Jackson, Paul. Jane's All The World's Aircraft 2003–2004. Coulsdon, Surry, UK: Jane's Information Group, 2003. .
 Taylor, John W R. (ed.). Jane's All the World's Aircraft 1988-89. Coulsdon, Surrey, UK: Jane's Information Group, 1988. .
 Taylor, Michael J.H. (ed.). Brassey's World Aircraft & Systems Directory 1999/2000. London: Brassey's, 1999. .
 Thisdell, Dan and Fafard, Antoine. "World Airliner Census". Flight International. Vol. 190, No. 5550, 9–15 August 2016, pp. 20–43. .

External links

 Specs & Photo at Flugzeuginfo.net
 Y-12 website

1980s Chinese civil utility aircraft
Harbin aircraft
Aircraft first flown in 1982
High-wing aircraft
STOL aircraft
Twin-turboprop tractor aircraft